WEAU (channel 13) is a television station licensed to Eau Claire, Wisconsin, United States, serving the La Crosse–Eau Claire market as an affiliate of NBC and The CW Plus. The station is owned by Gray Television, and maintains studios on South Hastings Way / US 53 Business in Altoona (with an Eau Claire postal address); its transmitter is located north of Fairchild, near the Eau Claire–Clark county line.

History
WEAU-TV signed-on December 17, 1953 under the ownership of Central Broadcasting Company. This ownership group was led by a predecessor to Morgan Murphy Media and also included the Eau Claire Leader-Telegram along with WEAU radio (790 AM, now WEAQ at 1150 AM, and 94.1 FM, now WIAL). It has always been a primary NBC affiliate but initially carried programs from CBS, ABC, and DuMont. The station later lost DuMont following that network's shutdown in 1956, CBS when La Crosse and Eau Claire were mixed into one giant market in 1958 (with La Crosse's WKBT becoming the market's CBS  affiliate), and ABC when WXOW (channel 19) signed on in 1970. During the late-1950s, the station was also briefly affiliated with the NTA Film Network. One of the first well-known personalities on WEAU was "Sheriff Bob" Dawson who hosted a children's show during the 1950s and 1960s.

The station initially broadcast from a tower immediately behind the WEAU studios on South Hastings Way in Eau Claire. The tower in Eau Claire is now topped by the digital transmitter of rival ABC affiliate WQOW (channel 18).

Morgan Murphy sold off WEAU radio in 1959; in 1962, it sold WEAU-TV to The Post Corporation of Appleton (Morgan Murphy would later purchase rival WKBT, channel 8). WEAU's departure from radio proved short-lived as The Post Corporation purchased Chippewa Falls radio station WAXX (1150 AM) in 1963, and two years later, established a new WEAU-FM at 100.7 (moving to 104.5 when the Fairchild tower was built) which largely simulcasted WAXX's country music format. WEAU-FM's call letters were switched to WAXX-FM in 1977, and in 1978, the country format was moved exclusively to WAXX-FM with the AM station becoming WAYY (which later moved to 790 AM in a swap with WEAQ).

In 1984, Racine-born George N. Gillett Jr. purchased the Post Corporation stations, including WEAU-TV, making it a sister station to Milwaukee's WITI for a short time. WAXX and WAYY were spun off to Central Communications at the same time, and in 1985, the two radio stations moved out of the WEAU building to a new facility behind its parking lot. Despite being under separate ownership, WEAU continued to provide weather forecasting services for WAXX and WAYY as well as other stations purchased by Central Communications (which included WEAU's original radio properties, WEAQ and WIAL, in addition to WECL and WDRK) until December 31, 2001. WEAU resumed providing weather services to those same six stations, now under the ownership of Maverick Media, on September 11, 2006.

Gillett began defaulting on some of his purchases in the late-1980s culminating in 1990 when he sold WEAU to Busse Broadcasting, owner of KOLN in Lincoln, Nebraska and KGIN in Grand Island, Nebraska (and at one point also owned WWMT in Kalamazoo, Michigan and KOKH-TV in Oklahoma City). In 1998, Gray Communications Systems (which was subsequently renamed Gray Television) and Cosmos Broadcasting (the broadcasting division of the Liberty Corporation which was later merged into Raycom Media and itself sold to Gray) teamed up to purchase the Busse stations with WEAU going to Cosmos and KOLN/KGIN going to Gray. Cosmos then traded WEAU back to Gray in exchange for WALB (Gray's original flagship station) in Albany, Georgia (that station returned to Gray in 2019 after WALB's last owner Raycom merged with Gray). Technology was the highlight of the following decade as WEAU-DT, which originally transmitted on channel 39, signed-on April 30, 2002 with the digital transmitter located at the top of the tower in Fairchild.

The station turned off its analog transmitter at 12:30 p.m. on February 16, 2009. At around 1 o'clock, WEAU's digital signal relocated from channel 39 to channel 13. On October 1, 2012, WEAU dropped the -TV suffix from its call sign. The tower was shared with former sister radio station WAXX. On March 22, 2011, this tower collapsed during an intense winter storm that brought a mixture of terrible weather conditions. A replacement tower was completed by December 15, 2011 and broadcasts resumed on UHF channel 38 in late December.

Programming

Syndicated programming
Syndicated programing on WEAU includes Wheel of Fortune, Jeopardy!, and The Kelly Clarkson Show, among others.

News operation

WEAU tends to focus its local news coverage on Eau Claire and the Chippewa Valley, with a secondary focus on La Crosse.

WEAU constructed its own Doppler weather radar in 1979, becoming the first television station in the market to have its own device and no longer rely on delayed data from the National Weather Service. It premiered a 5 o'clock weeknight newscast on September 14, 1981. A satellite truck to provide live remote broadcasts came into use by 1983. The station was met with tragedy in September 1991 when weeknight news anchor Cindy Schott died unexpectedly. Her death was later the subject of a story on Real Life with Jane Pauley and Dateline NBC. WEAU resorted to a solo anchor format for the 6 and 10 p.m. news (John Froyd) following Schott's death but returned to a co-anchor format for their weeknight 10 o'clock program (Pat Kreitlow and Judy Clark) in August 1998 upon Froyd's retirement.

On August 28, 2006, WEAU entered into a news share agreement with Fox affiliates WLAX/WEUX (then owned by Grant Broadcasting System II). The arrangement resulted in those stations airing a weeknight prime time newscast produced by this NBC outlet. Known as Fox 25/48 News at 9, the half-hour broadcast would eventually be expanded to weekends starting January 20, 2007.

WLAX/WEUX features a majority of WEAU's on-air team except for maintaining a separate weeknight meteorologist and weekend news anchor (although they can fill-in on the NBC outlet when needed). Fox 25/48 News at 9 originates from a secondary set at WEAU's studios and is fed to the WLAX/WEUX facility through a fiber-optic link. On August 5, 2011, WEAU upgraded its newscasts to high definition level. However, the WLAX/WEUX newscasts were not included in the change because they were produced from a secondary set that lacked HD cameras. As of fall 2015, Fox 25/48 News is broadcast in high definition.

Notable former on-air staff
Craig Coshun – BS Wisconsin Broadcaster/Big Ten Play-By-Play Announcer; WEAU Reporter/Anchor: 1988–90
Pat Kreitlow – Wisconsin State Senator, 23rd District (D-Chippewa Falls), 2007–2011; WEAU Anchor/Reporter: mid 1990s–2005
Cameron Sanders – CNN Correspondent & Host of public radio's Marketplace; WEAU Reporter: 1979–80

Technical information

Subchannels
The station's digital signal is multiplexed:

Translators

From July 2020 to September 13, 2021, WEAU was rebroadcast via a Digital Replacement Translator in the La Crosse area on RF channel 30.

References

External links

NBC network affiliates
The CW affiliates
Cozi TV affiliates
MeTV affiliates
Heroes & Icons affiliates
Movies! affiliates
Start TV affiliates
Gray Television
Television channels and stations established in 1953
EAU
1953 establishments in Wisconsin